This is a list of ambassadors of the Russian Socialist Federative Soviet Republic and Soviet Union to the Bukharan People's Soviet Republic.

Ambassadors of the RSFSR/Soviet Union to the Bukharan People's Soviet Republic

References

 
Bukharan